The 2009–10 season was the 46th season in Bursaspor's existence, and their 4th consecutive year in the top-flight of Turkish football, and covered the period from 1 July 2009 to 16 May 2010. The club, having finished 6th the previous season, missed out on a European place by just three points and hence did not play any competitive European games.

On 16 May 2010 Bursaspor won the Super Lig after beating defending champions Beşiktaş 2–1 at home. They won the league by just one point above second placed Fenerbahçe, although they had an 11-point gap over third placed Galatasaray. Their win ended 26 years of the "Istanbul Big Three" dominance.

Bursaspor had the strongest strikeforce and the second strongest defence, of all teams in the league. It was manager Ertuğrul Sağlam's first full season in charge having taken over in January 2009, and it was the first time he has won the league. It was quoted that they had a budget of only €10m, a tenth of the budget of the 'Istanbul Three' in Turkey, with Galatasaray having a budget of €125m.

Bursaspor are only the second club based outside of Istanbul to ever win the league title in the history of Turkish top-flight football. The other club was Trabzonspor, who last won the league in 2021/22.

Season 2009–10
Sağlam set his target for the club to finish the 2009–10 season in the top three and to play European football next season. In December 2009, the club were sitting (temporarily) in the top spot in the Süper Lig table for the first time that season, and the first time ever in their history.

The first half of the season saw a 1–0 home victory against Istanbul giants Galatasaray, and also a 2–3 win away at Besiktas. In late 2009, manager Sağlam was linked with the vacant Turkey managerial position after Fatih Terim's resignation, but he refused to comment on the speculation. Guus Hiddink eventually took up the position. The early part of the season saw a 6–0 win over midtable Istanbul B.B., the largest win in the league in the 2009–10 season, as well as coming from two goals down in the last ten minutes to beat Fenerbahce 2–3 away. In the Turkish Cup Bursaspor reached the quarter-finals but lost 4–3 on aggregate to Fenerbahce, after an injury time winner from Fener.

In April 2010 Bursa sat at the top of the table after floating around the top three since the beginning of the year. At one point during their stay at the summit they were 8 points above the second placed team. After securing a win by coming from behind to win 2–1 against Antalyaspor, after having lost the previous week for the first time in eight league games, Sağlam was quoted as saying that “We (Bursaspor) are on the verge of becoming a great team”, "we had to win, even if it meant coming from behind to do so. That was the important thing”.

Five weeks before the end of the season, Bursaspor fell to second place in the league. They maintained pressure on Fenerbahce who had overtaken them. Going into the final game of the season, Bursaspor were just one point behind Fener. Needing to better Fener's result, they won 2–1 at home against Beşiktaş. Fenerbahçe only managed a 1–1 home draw against Trabzonspor meaning that Bursaspor were crowned Champions, by just one point.

Bursa had the strongest strikeforce in the league as well as the second tightest defence; conceding just one more goal than Besiktas. The league positions of the club saw them outside of the top five on only four occasions and they stayed in the top three consecutively from December 2009 until they were crowned champions in May 2010, for 18 weeks.

They are only the fifth Champion of the Turkish league in its 52-year history.

Team kit
The team kit for the 2009–10 season was produced by Puma and the shirt sponsor is Turkcell. The kit is the traditional green with green and white striped socks.

Technical staff

First-team squad
As of February 1, 2010.

Transfers

In

Winter Transfers 09/10
As of February 1, 2010.

Out

Winter Departure Players 09/10
As of February 1, 2010.

 to Giresunspor
 to Dortmund II
 to Tom Tomsk
 to Barueri

Loaned in

Loaned out

For recent transfers, see List of Turkish football transfers 2008-09.

Match results

League table

Results by round

Records

Doubles achieved

Biggest winning margin

References

External links
Bursaspor official site

2009-10
Turkish football clubs 2009–10 season
2009-10